This is a list of official National symbols of Haiti

References